Pierre-Etienne Moitte (1722 – 1780) was a French painter-engraver.

Moitte was born in Paris. He became a painter who is better known today for his engravings after old masters. His son Alexandre Moitte (1750-1828) also became a painter.

Moitte died in Paris.

References 

 Pierre Moitte in the Web Gallery of Art

1722 births
1780 deaths
Artists from Paris
French engravers